is a book by the English travel writer Isabella Bird, in the form of letters to her sister, describing her journey from Tokyo to Hokkaido in 1878, when she was 47. It was first published in two volumes in 1880 by John Murray, which later issued an abridged one-volume version in 1885.

The book recounts how Bird made the journey with a Japanese interpreter named Ito, visiting places that few or no Westerners had seen before, between June and September 1878. It records in great detail her responses to Japanese houses, clothing and customs, and the natural environment, as they were during the early years of the Meiji Restoration. It also has a long section describing her visits to the Ainu people, and many passages describing what seemed to her the extreme poverty of many Japanese outside the major cities.

Isabella Bird in Wonderland, a manga based on the book, was published in 2015.

References

External links
 
 

Books about Japan